Thomas Barker may refer to:
Thomas Barker (academic), principal of Brasenose College, Oxford, 1777–1785
Thomas Barker (Australian politician) (1799–1875), Australian politician in New South Wales
Thomas Barker (cricketer, born 1798) (1798–1877), English cricketer
Thomas Barker (cricketer, born 1812) (1812–1873), English cricketer
Thomas Barker (fishing guide) ( 1591–1651), British author who wrote about fishing
Thomas Barker (mathematician) (1838–1907), Scottish mathematician and professor of pure mathematics
Thomas Barker (meteorologist) (1722–1809), weather observer
Thomas Barker (painter) (1769–1847), British painter of landscape and rural life
Thomas F. Barker (1828–1896), political figure in New Brunswick
Thomas Henry Barker (1841–1917), secretary of the Liverpool Chamber of Commerce
Thomas Holliday Barker (1818–1889), English temperance advocate and vegetarian
Thomas Jones Barker (1815–1882), English historical and portrait painter
Thomas Richard Barker (1799–1870), English Independent minister and college tutor
Thomas William Barker (1861–1912), Carmarthenshire solicitor
Tom Barker (basketball) (born 1955), retired American basketball player
Tom Barker (designer) (born 1966), British designer and academic
Tom Barker (trade unionist) (1887–1970), New Zealand tram conductor, trade unionist and socialist